Connie Mason (born August 24, 1937) is an American model and actress who was Playboy magazine's Playmate of the Month for its June 1963 issue. Mason then acted in the gore movies pioneered by Herschell Gordon Lewis, Blood Feast and Two Thousand Maniacs!  Her centerfold was photographed by Pompeo Posar. She was also a Playboy Bunny at the Chicago club.

Biography
Mason was born in 1937 in Washington, D.C. and began her career in the early 1960s. She attended a private school for girls in Danville, Virginia. At the age of 17, she moved to Florida with her family. She was managing the cosmetics department for Jordan Marsh in Miami.

There, her parents went to the opening of the new Playboy Club. They were guests of their friend Tony Roma. Roma suggested to her father (who built custom homes) that his daughter apply to be a bunny at the newly opened Playboy club. Playboy clubs were all the rage across the country and in London, England. He said they were looking for pretty girls with great personalities and good figures. Mason was hired as the "camera bunny", and was a huge hit with all the customers because of her "bubbly personality".

Mason then moved to Chicago, and met Hugh Hefner and moved into his mansion and went to work at the club as the bunny photographer. He asked her if she would be interested in testing with the magazine's staff photographer, to be featured as center fold for the popular Playboy magazine. She was chosen by Hefner to be Playboy magazine's Playmate of the Month for its June 1963 issue. Then, one night when she was working, Mason was introduced to the Oleg Cassini, Jackie Kennedy's personal designer. Cassini encouraged her to come to New York City, where he introduced her to the Eileen Ford Agency. The agency signed Mason, thus beginning a career in fashion modeling and national TV commercials.

Mason was discovered by director Herschell Gordon Lewis in 1963; she was cast in the starring role to work in the horror movie Blood Feast (1963) directed by him the same year. This was followed by the leading part in the film Two Thousand Maniacs! (1964), also directed by Lewis.

She met and married Shelly Kasten in New York City, who was the entertainment director for all the Playboy Clubs. Mason previously married actor, Tony Young from 1958 to 1962.

Filmography 
 Walk Like a Dragon (1960) (uncredited) as Diane
 Blood Feast (1963) as Suzette Fremont
 Two Thousand Maniacs (1964) as Terry Adams
 Tell Me That You Love Me, Junie Moon (1970) (uncredited) as Extra
 Lovers and Other Strangers (1970) (uncredited) as Extra
 Made for Each Other (1971) (as Connie Snow) as Ingrid
 Diamonds Are Forever (1971) (uncredited) as Woman at Whyte House
 Rolling Man (1972) as Connie
 The Godfather: Part II (1974) (uncredited) as Extra
 Sudden Death (1977) (uncredited)
 Doctors' Private Lives (1978) as Anne
 Tangiers (1982)

See also
 List of people in Playboy 1960–1969

References

External links 
 
 

1937 births
Living people
1960s Playboy Playmates
Models from Washington, D.C.